The Gudjal, also known as the Kutjala, are an Indigenous Australian people of northern Queensland.

Language
The Gudjal spoke a dialect of the Warrongo subgroup of Greater Maric. The materials surviving from earlier periods are not sufficient to reconstruct the language on its own, and arrangements were made, as part of a revitalization programme, to adopt terms and usages still attested for the Gugu-Badhun language.

Country
Gudjal traditional lands encompassed an estimated  on both sides of the Great Dividing Range, taking in At Mount Sturgeon, Mount Emu Plains, the Lolworth and Reedy Springs Stations. It includes the upper Clarke River. The eastern extension ran close to Charters Towers.

History of contact
As colonial settlements began, with their lands been expropriated for cattle runs, the Gudjal were forced southwards towards Hughenden and Pentland.

Art
The Gudjal created rock art galleries; one conspicuous example can be found in the vicinity of Charters Towers.

Alternative names
 Gudjali
 Koochul-bura

Some words
 younga (mother)
 wurboon (whiteman)
 galbin (children)

Notes

Citations

Sources

External links 

 Gudjal Language Recordings, State Library of Queensland

Aboriginal peoples of Queensland